is a Japanese former football  player who played for Blaublitz Akita.

Club statistics
Updated to 31 December 2020.

Honours
 Blaublitz Akita
 J3 League (2): 2017, 2020

References

External links
Profile at Blaublitz Akita

1987 births
Living people
Fukuoka University alumni
Association football people from Saga Prefecture
Japanese footballers
J3 League players
Japan Football League players
Blaublitz Akita players
Association football midfielders
People from Imari, Saga